Piotr of Bogoria and Skotnik (died 1283) was a Polish nobleman (szlachcic) member of the Bogoriowie family of the Bogorya coat of arms.

Piotr was castellan of Wiślica about 1268 and voivode of the Sandomierz Voivodeship about 1280.

Children:
 Wojciech of Bogoria and Żminogród
 Mikołaj of Bogoria and Skotnik
 Stanisława of Bogoria and Skotnik
 Paweł of Bogoria and Skotnik (died 1331)
 N.N. (daughter) was married to voivode of Kalisz. Her son Janusz Suchywilk of Grzymala coat of arms, became Archbishop of Gniezno after her brother Jarosław.
 Jarosław of Bogoria and Skotnik

13th-century births
1283 deaths
Piotr of Bogoria and Skotnik
13th-century Polish nobility